Dalcerides bicolor is a moth in the family Dalceridae. It was described by Schaus in 1910. It is found in Costa Rica.

References

Moths described in 1910
Dalceridae